VA-66 was an Attack Squadron of the U.S. Navy; it was the second squadron to be so named. The squadron was called to duty and established as Reserve Fighter Squadron VF-671 on 1 February 1951. It was redesignated Fighter Squadron VF-81 on 4 February 1953, and finally as VA-66 on 1 July 1955. The squadron was disestablished on 1 October 1986, but one detachment continued in existence until 31 March 1987. The squadron's nickname was the Waldomen from the 1950s to the early 1960s, and the Waldos from that point forward. Its insignia, a rooster toting a machine gun, was a well-known design in naval aviation.

Operational history
 January–February 1953: VF-81, with its F9F-5s, participated in operational tests aboard the Navy’s first angled deck carrier, .
 April 1954: VF-81 became the first operational fleet squadron to receive and operate the F7U Cutlass.
 27 May 1959: During the squadron’s deployment to the Mediterranean Sea, the commanding officer, Commander McNeil, was killed in an aircraft accident during a practice Carrier Controlled Approach.
 14 August 1962: The squadron participated in cross deck operations aboard the British carrier .
 31 July–3 October 1964: Enterprise, with VA-66 embarked, participated in Operation Sea Orbit, the first circumnavigation of the world by a nuclear task force. The sixty-five-day voyage was accomplished without replenishment. The squadron participated in numerous airpower demonstrations during the voyage.
 8 June 1967: VA-66’s aircraft were part of an Air Wing 6 strike group that was launched to defend  when she came under attack by the Israelis during the 1967 Six-Day War. When word was received that the attack had been a mistake on the part of the Israelis, the aircraft were recalled.
During the crisis the American Ambassador was killed and anti-American demonstrations took place which led to the evacuation of U.S. citizens to American vessels.
 15 April 1980:  deployed to the Indian Ocean as part of the continuing response to the Iran hostage crisis.
 22 December 1980: The squadron returned from its deployment to the Indian Ocean after spending a total of 246 days at sea. With only one port visit, the longest at sea period was for 153 days.
 June 1982: After the Israeli invasion of Lebanon on 6 June, VA-66 operated in the Eastern Mediterranean.
 24 June 1982: VA-66 provided air support during the evacuation of Americans from Beirut, Lebanon, prior to the siege of Beirut by the Israelis.
 25 October 1983: Due to the 1983 Beirut barracks bombing, Eisenhower terminated its visit to Naples and departed for the eastern Mediterranean. The squadron operated in the vicinity of Lebanon until the latter part of November.
 7 March 1985: Eisenhower cut short a visit to Palma, Spain, and made a high speed transit to the Eastern Mediterranean due to the increased tension in Lebanon.
 1 October 1986: VA-66 was officially disestablished but continued to operate as a detachment. The detachment continued to operate because its primary mission during the deployment was to provide HARM missile support for the air wing and carrier.
 30 January 1987: Kennedy cancelled its port visit to Málaga, Spain, and made a high speed transit to the eastern Mediterranean due to the increased tension over the Lebanon hostage crisis.
 31 March 1987: VA-66 Detachment was disestablished.

Home port assignments
The squadron was assigned to these home ports, effective on the dates shown:
 NAS Atlanta – 1 February 1951
 NAS Jacksonville – 5 April 1951
 NAS Quonset Point – 28 September 1951
 NAS Oceana – 11 June 1952
 NAS Cecil Field – 15 March 1965

Aircraft assignment
The squadron first received the following aircraft on the dates shown:
 F4U-4 Corsair – February 1951
 F8F-2 Bearcat – 13 June 1952
 F9F-5 Panther – 5 December 1952
 F7U-3 Cutlass – April 1954
 F9F-8B Cougar – August 1956
 A4D-1 Skyhawk – March 1958
 A4D-2 Skyhawk – June 1958
 A4D-2N/A4-C Skyhawk – March 1961
 A-7E Corsair II – October 1970

See also
 Attack aircraft
 List of inactive United States Navy aircraft squadrons
 History of the United States Navy

References

Attack squadrons of the United States Navy
Wikipedia articles incorporating text from the Dictionary of American Naval Aviation Squadrons